Neral is a town in Raigad district in the Indian state of Maharashtra. It is 83 km+ developing city of Raigad district which is well connected to Panvel, Mumbai, Thane and Pune. Local people from communities like Agri, Kumbhar, Brhamin, Muslim, etc settled here because this place was  key route to Matheran and vikatgad which were politically important for maratha empire, Mughal empire and East India Company. Neral to Matheran Train Route was devoloped by East India Company For traiding and colonial pourposes. hutatma vir bhai kotwal was a great hero who rebel against British Police in Neral - Matheran.

Geography
It has an average elevation of 40 metres (131 feet). Neral is a place which is the center between Mumbai and Pune, Neral has State Highway which is connecting to Karjat, NH4, Panvel and Murbad, people who visits Neral from Mumbai-South takes via Panvel route which is better, faster and easy to drive. Neral is at key location in the proposed Uran-Panvel-Neral-Bhimashankar SH-54 State Highway.

It is popularly known as a railroad junction, with trains arriving from Mumbai and from Pune to the nearby and very popular hill station of Matheran. A narrow-gauge rail line, 21 km long, ("toy train") runs from Neral to Matheran. Nearest major towns are Badlapur and Karjat.

2005 rainfall
The heavy rains on 26 July 2005 ruined the rail tracks and it had stopped operating, but the train has successfully started operating from 5 March 2007. The other option available to reach Matheran is to take a taxi to a certain point (called Dasturi naka) just before Matheran city boundary, beyond which one may proceed only on foot or on horseback.

Matheran Toy Train 
The famous Matheran - Neral Toy Train departs from Neral Station. This train goes from Neral to Matheran.

Photo gallery

See also
 Neral railway station
 List of Mumbai Suburban Railway stations
 Matheran

References

Cities and towns in Raigad district